Mahtab Norouzi (c. 1934 – 14 July 2012) was an Iranian Balochi master artisan in traditional Balochi needlework and embroidery.

Biography 
Mahtab Norouzi (English: Moonlight New Year) was born in c. 1934 and had lived in the small village of Qasemabad, Bampur in Sistan and Baluchestan province, Iran. She had learned to do the traditional Balochi embroidery from her mother, starting at age 15. She never married and lived alone, but she taught all the children in the village her crafting skills. She worked for nearly 50 years, creating various textiles.

The art of traditional Iranian needlework was largely forgotten until the early 1980s, with an influx of imported and mass manufactured products mimicking the style. As a result, the providence of this type of work is not always known. In 2007, she was honored with the title of one of the "Forgotten Treasures of Iranian Art" by the Iranian Academy of the Arts, they had named only thirteen people with this title. Additionally the Cultural Heritage Office of the Sistan and Baluchestan Province gave her a pension payment for a few years for her work. 

The last four years of her life she stopped embroidery because she struggled with back problems, low vision, and Alzheimer's disease; and she lived with her niece Zeinab Norouzi who is also a noted craftsperson. Norouzi died on 14 July 2012 in Qasemabad, Bampur.  

Shahbanu Farah Diba Pahlavi had wore Balochi embroidered clothes in various ceremonies, and some of that work is thought to have been made by Norouzi. Her works are included in the Sa'dabad Museum in Tehran.

See also 
 Balochi clothing

References 

1934 births
2012 deaths
Needlework
Embroiderers
Women textile artists
People from Sistan and Baluchistan Province
Baloch culture
Iranian artists
People with Alzheimer's disease
Iranian textile artists